Maksim Sergeyevich Bobylev (born 30 May 1992) is a former Russian professional football player.

Career
Bobylev is a product of FC Shinnik Yaroslavl's youth system, and he joined the senior side in the Russian Football National League during 2012. He made his debut on 8 May 2012 in a game against FC Mordovia Saransk.

References

External links
 
 
 Career summary at sportbox.ru

1992 births
Footballers from Yaroslavl
Living people
Russian footballers
Association football midfielders
FC Shinnik Yaroslavl players
FC Znamya Truda Orekhovo-Zuyevo players